Matthew or Matt Wells may refer to:
 Matthew Wells (field hockey) (born 1978), Australian Olympic field hockey defender
 Matthew Wells (linebacker) (born 1990), American football player
 Matthew Wells (rower) (born 1979), British Olympic rower
 Matt Wells (television presenter), Canadian television presenter and musician
 Matt Wells (boxer) (1886–1953), British boxer
 Matt Wells (American football coach) (born 1973), Texas Tech head football coach
 Matt Wells (football coach) (born 1988), AFC Bournemouth assistant head coach